Isingiro Water Supply and Sanitation Project (IWSSP), also Isingiro Water Supply and Sewerage System is a water intake, purification, distribution and waste water collection and disposal system in Isingiro District, in the Western Region of Uganda. The project is intended to meet the water supply and sanitation needs of 340,000 people (61.8 percent) of the 550,000 inhabitants of the district. The beneficiaries include the 100,000 occupants of Nakivale Refugee Settlement and the 32,000 occupants of Oruchinga Refugee Settlement. The work is to be carried out by the Uganda Ministry of Water and Environment through the parastatal utility company, National Water and Sewerage Corporation (NWSC). Funding (loan and grants), have been provided by the French Development Agency and the European Union.

Location

Overview
In 2021 the Government of Uganda borrowed funds from the Agence française de développement (AFD) to establish the Isingiro District Water Supply and Sanitation Project, in Western Uganda. The main objective is to improve water supply and sanitation services in the district and specifically, to two refugee camps in the district, with intake capacities of 100,000 people and 32,000 people respectively, for a total of 132,000 refugees. Another 208,000 non-refugee inhabitants will also benefit, out of a total district population of 550,000.

The water intake point will be from the Kagera River that forms the southern border of Isingiro District and simultaneously the international border between Uganda and neighboring Tanzania. The raw water will be pumped to a location where a new water purification plant will be constructed. The treated potable water will then be distributed to the two refuge camps and to the rural and urban communities in Isingiro District.

This project is affiliated with another ongoing government undertaking by the same ministry; the Masaka–Mbarara Water Supply and Sanitation Project. The Kagera River will serve as the raw water source for the city of Mbarara as well. This second project will also be executed by NWSC, also with funding from the AFD.

Other planned infrastructure developments include the construction of sanitary systems in the two refugee settlements and in several urban centres in Isingiro District.

Funding
The table below outlines he sources of funding for this project.

The grant of €8 million by the European Union is specifically intended to be used to establish a sanitary system in the two refugee camps of Nakivale and Oruchinga.

In August 2022, the French Development Agency and the government of Uganda signed documents for loans amounting to €153 million (approx. USh604.8 billion), related to this and other water and sanitation projects in the districts of Gulu, Kyankwanzi, Kalungu and Bushenyi.

Other considerations
This project is expected to reduce the waste water discharged into Lake Nakivale and also reduce the quantity of water extracted from the same lake.

See also
 Ministry of Water and Environment (Uganda)
 Busia Water Supply and Sanitation Project
 Gulu Water Supply and Sanitation Project

References

External links
 Website of National Water & Sewerage Corporation
 Website of Ministry of Water and Environment (Uganda)
 Uganda: AFD And The EU To Finance Better And Inclusive Access To Rural Water In The District Of Isingiro As of 21 September 2021.

Buildings and structures in Uganda
Isingiro District
Water resources management
Western Region, Uganda